Sir Frank Walter Goldstone (7 December 1870 – 25 December 1955) was a British teacher, trade unionist and politician.

Biography

Goldstone was born in Bishopwearmouth, County Durham (now Sunderland) on 7 December 1870. The third son of a stained-glass artist, he attended Borough Road Traininge College, Isleworth after completing education at Diamond Hall in Millfield.

From 1891 to 1910, Goldstone was an assistant master at Bow Street school in Sheffield. In 1895, he had married Elizabeth Alice Henderson of Whittingham, Northumberland. They had two children, Elsie (born 1897) and Frank (born 1899).

A member of the National Union of Teachers (NUT), he became president of the subgroup National Federation of Class Teachers in 1902, a member of the Executive Committee of the NUT in 1902 and Chair of its Law Committee in 1904. In 1910, he stepped up his participation in the NUT, serving as Organization Secretary (1910–1918), Assistant Secretary (1918–1924) and finally General Secretary (1924–1931).

Politics

Shortly before the December 1910 election, Goldstone was chosen as the Labour candidate for Sunderland, as a late replacement for R. J. Wilson (a member of the Co-operative Society). After winning the seat, he was appointed Labour Chief Whip in 1914. He lost his seat at the 1918 election.

Later life

Goldstone was knighted by George V at Buckingham Palace on 29 June 1931, the same year he retired as General Secretary of NUT. 

Subsequently, he served three years as principal of a tutorial college. In 1942 his wife died in Ipswich, and Goldstone followed in the same town on 25 December 1955.

References
Duncan Tanner, Goldstone, Sir Frank Walter (1870–1955), Oxford Dictionary of National Biography, Oxford University Press, Sept 2004; online edition, Jan 2008 accessed 16 May 2008

Further reading
The coming General Secretary, The Schoolmaster (11 January 1924), 39
S. Blake and A. E. Henshall, Schoolmaster and Woman Teacher's Chronicle (6 January 1956)
B. Simon, The politics of educational reform, 1920–1940 (1974)
R. Barker, Education and politics, 1900–1951: a study of the labour party (1972)

External links 
 

Knights Bachelor
People from Sunderland
Politicians from Tyne and Wear
Trade unionists from Tyne and Wear
Politicians awarded knighthoods
General Secretaries of the National Union of Teachers
Labour Party (UK) MPs for English constituencies
National Union of Teachers-sponsored MPs
1870 births
1955 deaths
UK MPs 1910–1918
Schoolteachers from County Durham
People from County Durham (before 1974)